The Volta–Niger family of languages, also known as West Benue–Congo or East Kwa, is one of the branches of the Niger–Congo language family, with perhaps 70 million speakers. Among these are the most important languages of southern Nigeria, Benin, Togo, and southeast Ghana: Yoruba, Igbo, Bini, and Gbe.

These languages have variously been placed within the Kwa or Benue–Congo families, but Williamson & Blench (2000) separate them from both. The boundaries between the various branches of Volta–Niger are rather vague, suggesting diversification of a dialect continuum rather than a clear split of families, which suggest a close origin.

Branches
The constituent groups of the Volta–Niger family, along with the most important languages in terms of number of speakers, are as follows (with number of languages for each branch in parentheses):

The Yoruboid languages and Akoko were once linked as the Defoid branch, but more recently they, Edoid, and Igboid have been suggested to be primary branches of an as-yet unnamed group, often abbreviated . Similarly, Oko, Nupoid, and Idomoid are often grouped together under the acronym . Ukaan is an Atlantic–Congo language, but it is unclear if it belongs to the Volta–Niger family; Blench suspects it is closer to Benue–Congo.

In an automated computational analysis (ASJP 4) by Müller et al. (2013):
Gbe and Yoruboid are subsumed within Kwa.
Edoid and Cross River group together.
Akpes and Ukaan group together.
Oko is grouped within Idomoid.

Branches and locations

Below is a list of major Volta–Niger branches and their primary locations (centres of diversity) in Nigeria based on Blench (2019).

Comparative vocabulary

Sample basic vocabulary in different Volta–Niger branches:

Numerals
Comparison of numerals in individual languages:

See also 
Systematic graphic of the Niger–Congo languages with numbers of speakers

References 

Wolf, Paul Polydoor de (1971) The Noun Class System of Proto-Benue–Congo (Thesis, Leiden University). The Hague/Paris: Mouton.
Williamson, Kay (1989) 'Benue–Congo Overview', pp. 248–274 in Bendor-Samuel, John & Rhonda L. Hartell (eds.) The Niger–Congo Languages — A classification and description of Africa's largest language family. Lanham, Maryland: University Press of America.
Williamson & Blench (2000) 'Niger–Congo', in Heine & Nurse, African Languages

 
Volta–Congo languages